Abdolvahab Shahidi (23 September 1922 – 10 May 2021) was an Iranian barbat player, singer and composer in the classical style. He is noted as one of the contemporary pioneers of Persian music by BBC Persian.

References 

1922 births
2021 deaths
Iranian composers
20th-century Iranian male singers
Male singers on Golha
Musicians from Isfahan